Silent Hill: The Escape is a 2007 first-person shooter game developed by Konami Digital Entertainment and published by Konami for mobile phones.

The game objective is for the player to make their way through ten levels by finding the key and opening the locked door at the end of each level. The player must slide their fingers to move the character in a first person perspective and tap the screen to shoot enemies. The player can tilt the device to change the camera perspective. This is also used while reloading the player's revolver, as you must align it correctly in order to reload.

Characters

Each character is unlocked after beating the game with the previous character.

Human: an unidentified person who does not remember how they got there, the human is seen with a neutral facial expression and is usually a male.

Alien: a grey alien investigating the cause of the abnormalities in the town of Silent Hill.

Mira: the Shiba Inu.

Robbie the Rabbit: Only appears in the tutorial level of the game.

Monsters 
Bubble Head Nurses

Wheelchair ghosts

Frog-like monsters

Ceiling monsters

Flying insects

Hooded monsters

References

2007 video games
Konami games
IOS games
Mobile games
Silent Hill games
Video games developed in Japan